Lothar Geitler (18 May 1899  – 1 May 1990) was an Austrian botanist and cytologist. He was born in Vienna. His main research interests included blue-green algae (Cyanophyta), diatoms, lichen symbioses and chromosome structure. 

The cyanobacteria genus Geitlerinema was named in his honour in 1989.

References

1899 births
1990 deaths
20th-century Austrian botanists